Würchwitz is a village and former municipality in the Burgenlandkreis district, in Saxony-Anhalt, Germany. Since 1 July 2009, it is part of the town Zeitz. It is the only place in the world that produces Milbenkäse (mite cheese), a German speciality cheese which dates back to the Middle Ages.

Former municipalities in Saxony-Anhalt
Zeitz